Rumpole and the Penge Bungalow Murders is a 2004 novel by John Mortimer about defence barrister Horace Rumpole. It describes the events of the Penge Bungalow Murders, a case frequently referred to by Rumpole in earlier stories. It also includes a description of how Rumpole first met Hilda and agreed to marry her, and how he first encountered the Timson family, who were to provide him with so much work as a defence counsel over the years. It was not based on a script, unlike many of the earlier stories.

References

Works by John Mortimer
2004 novels
Viking Press books
London Borough of Bromley